Jaminjung is a moribund Australian language spoken around the Victoria River in the Northern Territory of Australia. There seems to be a steady increase in the number of speakers of the language with very few people speaking the language in 1967, about 30 speakers in 1991, and between 50 and 150 speakers in 2000.

Phonology

Vowels 
Jaminjung has 4 vowels:

Vowel length is not distinctive. The close-mid vowel /e/ only appears in a small number of words, and is probably a loan from surrounding languages.

Consonants 
Jaminjung has 18 consonants:

External links 
 A corpus of Jaminjung recordings is archived with the DOBES project.

References

Notes

General 
 

Yirram languages
Endangered indigenous Australian languages in the Northern Territory